Ma Yiming (born August 1957) is a lieutenant general in the People's Liberation Army of China.

Biography
Ma was born in Deng County (now Dengzhou), Henan, in August 1957. He was assigned to the 26th Group Army (now 80th Group Army) in 2004. He moved up the ranks to become chief of staff in March 2004 and commander in February 2008. In December 2012, he was made chief of staff of the Jinan Military Region, but having held the position for only two years, then he was promoted to become assistant to the Chief of General Staff of the People's Liberation Army. In January 2016, he was commissioned as assistant chief of staff of the Joint Staff Department of the Central Military Commission, and one year later rose to become deputy chief of staff, serving in the post until his retirement in December 2020.

He was promoted to the rank of major general (shaojiang) in July 2005 and lieutenant general (zhongjiang) in July 2014.

References

1957 births
Living people
People from Dengzhou
People's Liberation Army generals from Henan
People's Republic of China politicians from Henan
Chinese Communist Party politicians from Henan